Cédric Tomio (born 1969) is a French ski mountaineer.

Selected results 
 1992:
 1st, European Cup (together with Thierry Bochet)
 1st, French Championship
 1994:
 2nd, French Championship
 1995:
 2nd, French Championship
 2001:
 2nd, European Championship team race (together with Vincent Meilleur)
 2nd, European Cup 
 2nd, French Championship
 3rd, Trophée des Gastlosen (European Cup, together with Vincent Meilleur)
 3rd, French national ranking
 2002:
 1st, Trophée des Gastlosen (together with Vincent Meilleur)
 5th, World Championship single race
 5th, World Championship combination ranking
 6th, World Championship team race (together with Vincent Meilleur)
 2003:
 8th, European Championship team race (together with Vincent Meilleur)
 9th, European Championship single race
 9th, European Championship combination ranking
 2004:
 1st, World Championship relay race (together with Stéphane Brosse, Florent Perrier and Patrick Blanc)
 6th, World Championship (together with Vincent Meilleur)

Pierra Menta 

 2001: 3rd, together with Vincent Meilleur
 2002: 4th, together with Vincent Meilleur
 2003: 3rd, together with Vincent Meilleur
 2004: 2nd, together with Vincent Meilleur

Trofeo Mezzalama 

 2003: 9th, together with Patrick Blanc and Tony Sbalbi

Notes 

1969 births
Living people
French male ski mountaineers
World ski mountaineering champions
20th-century French people
21st-century French people